Alexandros Alvanos ( born 9 April 1980) is a Greek retired handball player and current coach. He was included in the  Greece national team for the 2004 Summer Olympics and at the 2005 World Championship.

References

External links
 

1980 births
Living people
Olympiacos H.C. players
Greek male handball players
Olympic handball players of Greece
Handball players at the 2004 Summer Olympics
Sportspeople from Volos